The Stoner House, in Fresno County, California near Sanger, California, was built in 1910. It was listed on the National Register of Historic Places in 1985.

The house, also known as Stoner Mansion, is a Craftsman in style.  It is characterized as a bungalow but it is larger than small bungalows in urban areas.  It has a 360-degree view from the top of a knoll in "beautiful Tivy Valley."  It is a one-and-a-half-story  building with four gables.

A two-level wood frame barn  is the one outbuilding.

It is located at 21143 E. Weldon Ave.

References

American Craftsman architecture in California
National Register of Historic Places in Fresno County, California
Houses completed in 1910